Ezequiel Cabeza De Baca (November 1, 1864 – February 18, 1917) was the first Hispano elected for office as lieutenant governor in New Mexico's first election. His term as lieutenant governor was followed by his election as the second elected governor of New Mexico. This term was brief as he died shortly after taking office. He was the state's first elected Hispanic governor, and the first governor born in New Mexico after its annexation by the United States.

Early life 
He was born in Las Vegas, New Mexico Territory on November 1, 1864. He studied at the Jesuit College, now Regis University, in Las Vegas, NM. He worked for the railroads before becoming an influential journalist and Editor of La Voz de Pueblo. Ezequiel C. de Baca was married on December 14, 1889, to Margarita C. de Baca at Peña Blanca, NM. He is a descendant of the original Spanish settlers who later became part of the Baca Family of New Mexico.

In 1891, he began working for the Las Vegas Spanish weekly newspaper La Voz del Pueblo. It was there that he became associated with the newspaper's publishers, Antonio Lucero (who would become New Mexico's first Secretary of State) and Felix Martinez (who would later found the Martinez Publishing Company).

De Baca served as a delegate to the Democratic National Convention in 1900. In 1912, after New Mexico became a state, he became its first Lieutenant Governor, serving from 1912 to 1917. It is during this period when he did his most important work for the State. He was a key to developing New Mexico's first state constitution which includes specific language about providing bilingual education to all citizens. His professional background as a journalist gave him deep insights into the needs of the citizens of New Mexico, which were further enriched by his travels around the state prior to being elected Lt. Governor. He did not want to pursue elected office to run for Governor but was vigorously lobbied by the party and ultimately consented. At the time the pay for these elected officials was very small and he had by now a large family. Although his failing health prevented him from taking a significant part in his own campaign, he was elected the Governor of New Mexico on November 7, 1916. Inaugurated on January 1, 1917, he was sworn into office on his sick bed in St. Vincent Sanitarium in Santa Fe, with only a score of persons attending.

He died on February 18, 1917, in office. He had been sick for a long period of time and had traveled to California for treatments which were not successful. He was buried in the Mount Calvary Cemetery in Las Vegas, New Mexico.

De Baca County is named for Governor de Baca.

Children of Ezequiel and Margarita
Ezequiel and Margarita Cabeza de Baca had 14 children, 5 of whom died in infancy.

 Adolfo Amado C de Baca 1890–1953
 Alvar Nunez C de Baca 1892–1892
 Horacio Virgilio C de Baca  1893–1893
 Margarita Esefan C de Baca de Martinez 1895–1969
 Jose C de Baca 1897–1897
 Horacio C de Baca 1898–1970
 Maria Juana C de Baca 1900–1902
 Celia C de Baca 1902–1996
 Hortencia C de Baca 1903–1996
 Alfonso C de Baca 1907–1951
 Maria Natalia Adeleida C de Baca 1909–1973
 Ezequiel C de Baca 1911–1911
 Adelina C de Baca 1913–2009
 Alicia C de Baca 1916–2010

See also 
 Baca Family of New Mexico
 List of minority governors and lieutenant governors in the United States

References

External links 
 
 Biographical information – National Governors Association
 Biographical information by Anselmo F. Arellano
 Biographical information – University of New Mexico

|-

|-

1864 births
1917 deaths
19th-century American politicians
American politicians of Mexican descent
American people of Spanish descent
Catholics from New Mexico
Democratic Party governors of New Mexico
Hispanic and Latino American state governors of the United States
Neomexicanos
People from Las Vegas, New Mexico
Baca family of New Mexico